Recreational fishing